Since 2006, the Champions Series is a series of tennis tournaments designed for former champion members of the ATP Tour. The Champions Series consists of tournaments played in select markets where top players of the sport compete in one-night, four-player events with two one-set semifinal matches and a one-set championship match played in one evening. Eligible players competing on the Champions Series have either held a Top 5 singles ranking; been a Grand-Slam singles finalist, or a singles player on a championship Davis Cup team during their ATP tour playing careers. The Champions Series allows one wild card of their choice at each event. The series is produced by Inside Out Sports & Entertainment. The minimum age to participate in a tournament is 30.

Sponsorship
In October, 2011, PowerShares QQQ signed a multi-year agreement with the Champions Series to become the title sponsor of this national tennis league of erstwhile ATP professionals. A new match format was introduced to complete all play on a single evening, with only four players involved. The new format is two semi-final matches consisting of a best-of-one-tiebreak set, followed by a one-set final for the championship. Prior to PowerShares QQQ, Outback Steakhouse served as the title sponsor of this seniors' league (as before Outback, the series was known simply as Champions Series Tennis). No matches were played in 2013 as the series realigned from the fall to the spring.

Player rankings
Players are ranked based upon performance in each event and a cumulative total is kept each calendar year. Top ranked players of the past include:

2008
1 Jim Courier
2 John McEnroe
3 Todd Martin
4 Wayne Ferreira
5 Aaron Krickstein

2007
1 Todd Martin 
2 Jim Courier 
3 Pete Sampras 
4 Wayne Ferreira
5 John McEnroe

2006
1 Jim Courier 
2 John McEnroe 
3 Todd Martin 
4 Wayne Ferreira 
5 Magnus Larsson

2008 Events/ Results
The Oliver Group Champions Cup, March 12–16, 2008
Todd Martin (USA) def. John McEnroe (USA), 6-3,6-1
The Residences at the Ritz-Carlton, Grand Cayman Legends Championship, April 16–20, 2008
Jim Courier (USA) def. Wayne Ferreira (RSA), 7-6(3),7-6(6)
Champions Cup Boston, April 30- May 4, 2008
John McEnroe (USA) def. Aaron Krickstein (USA), 5-7,6-3,10-5(TB)

Former international events
Champions Cup Athens, held in 2007 in Athens, Greece 
Stanford Cup held in 2005 and 2006 in Houston, Texas
Stanford Championships held in 2006 in Memphis, Tennessee, relocated to Dallas in 2007

2007 Events/ Results
The Oliver Group Champions Cup, March 7–11, 2007
Wayne Ferreira (RSA) def. Aaron Krickstein (USA), 6-3, 6-3
Champions Cup Boston, May 2–6, 2007
Pete Sampras (USA) def. Todd Martin (USA), 6-3,5-7,11-9(TB)
Champions Cup Athens, May 17–20, 2007
Pete Sampras (USA) def. Todd Martin (USA), 6-3,1-6,10-6(TB)
The Gibson Guitar Champions Cup, August 22–26, 2007
Todd Martin (USA) def. John McEnroe (USA), 7-5,7-5
The Championships at the Palisades, September 26–30, 2007
Pete Sampras (USA) def. Todd Martin (USA), 6-3,6-4
The Stanford Championships, October 18–21, 2007
Wayne Ferreira (RSA) def. Jim Courier (USA), 2-6,6-3,11-9(TB)
The Legends Rock Dubai, November 20–24, 2007
Paul Haarhuis (NED) def. Jim Courier (USA), 6-1, 6-4

2006 Events/ Results
Champions Cup Naples, March 10–13, 2006
Jim Courier (USA) def. Pat Cash (AUS), 6-4,7-6(8)
Champions Cup Boston, April 27–30, 2006
Todd Martin (USA) def. John McEnroe (USA), 6-3,4-6,10-8(TB)
The Championships at the Palisades, September 20–24, 2006
Jim Courier (USA) def. Todd Martin (USA), 5-7,7-6(6),10-4(TB)
Stanford Championships, October 4–8, 2006
Magnus Larsson (SWE) def. Wayne Ferreira (RSA), 6-3,6-4
Stanford Cup, November 8–12, 2006
Wayne Ferreira (RSA) def. Magnus Larsson (SWE), 7-5,6-3

References

External links
Official series website
Inside Out Sports website

 
Recurring sporting events established in 2005
Tennis tours and series
Senior sports competitions